Cymia tectum is a species of sea snail, a marine gastropod mollusk in the family Muricidae, the murex snails or rock snails. The average size of a cymia tectum shell measures between 30–75 mm.

Description

Distribution

References

External links

Cymia
Gastropods described in 1828